Agate is the designation of an unguided French test rocket developed in the late 1950s and early 1960s. The Agate has a length of 8.50 metres, a diameter of 0.80 metres, a start mass of 3.2 tonnes, a takeoff thrust of 186 kN and a ceiling of 20 km. The Agate was launched from the CIEES test site in Hammaguir, French Algeria, and the Ile de Levant test site, in order to test instrument capsules and recovery systems.

See also  
 French space program
 Nuclear dissuasion

References

External links
Agate

Rockets and missiles
Space launch vehicles of France